Colette L. Heald is a Canadian-born professor at the Massachusetts Institute of Technology (MIT) who is an expert in atmospheric chemistry.

She was born in Montreal and grew up in Ottawa. She received a BSc in engineering physics from Queen's University and a PhD in Earth and Planetary Science from Harvard University. She was first exposed to atmospheric science while doing research projects at the University of Toronto. In 2008, she became an assistant professor of atmospheric science at Colorado State University. She moved to MIT in 2012, where she holds positions in both the Department of Civil and Environmental Engineering and the Department of Earth, Atmospheric and Planetary Sciences. She is head of the Atmospheric Chemistry and Composition Research group at MIT.

Her research interests include atmospheric gases and particles and their effect on air quality, ecosystems and climate. Research by Heald demonstrated that there was limited understanding of the sources of organic aerosols in the atmosphere which led to further scientific investigation in this area. She has become known as an expert on secondary organic aerosols.

Heald has been chair of the Aerosol Working Group for the GEOS-Chem atmospheric model since 2009. From 2006 to 2007, she held the NOAA Climate and Global Change postdoctoral fellowship at the University of California, Berkeley.

In 2015, she received the James B. Macelwane Medal from the American Geophysical Union.

References 

Year of birth missing (living people)
Living people
Queen's University at Kingston alumni
Harvard University alumni
Massachusetts Institute of Technology School of Science faculty
Women planetary scientists
Planetary scientists